Vexillum costatum is a species of small sea snail. It is a marine gastropod mollusk in the family Costellariidae, the ribbed miters.

Description
The length of the shell varies between 21 mm and 43 mm.

Distribution
In tropical Pacific from the Philippines to Polynesia.

References

External links
 Gmelin, J. F. (1791). Vermes. In: Gmelin J.F. (Ed.) Caroli a Linnaei Systema Naturae per Regna Tria Naturae, Ed. 13. Tome 1(6). G.E. Beer, Lipsiae 
  Cernohorsky, Walter Oliver. The Mitridae of Fiji; The veliger vol. 8 (1965)

costatum
Gastropods described in 1791